Live at Jacksonville is a live album by the band King Crimson, released through the King Crimson Collectors' Club in December 1998.

The concert presented was recorded at the Baseball Park, Jacksonville, Florida, USA, February 26, 1972. Part of "Sailor's Tale" had been released previously on the live album Earthbound (1972).

Track listing
"Pictures of a City" (Robert Fripp, Peter Sinfield) – 9:47
"Cirkus" (Fripp, Sinfield) – 9:08
"Ladies of the Road" (Fripp, Sinfield) – 6:39
"Formentera Lady" (Fripp, Sinfield) – 10:21
"Sailor's Tale" (Fripp) – 14:06
"21st Century Schizoid Man" (Fripp, Michael Giles, Greg Lake, Ian McDonald, Sinfield) – 10:25

Personnel
Mel Collins – saxophone, flute, Mellotron
Robert Fripp – guitar, Mellotron
Boz Burrell – bass guitar, vocals
Ian Wallace – drums, vocals

References

External links
 King Crimson - Live at Jacksonville (rec. 1972, rel. 1998) album releases & credits at Discogs
 King Crimson - Live at Jacksonville (rec. 1972, rel. 1998) album credits & user reviews at ProgArchives.com

1998 live albums
King Crimson Collector's Club albums